Fred James Hancock (March 28, 1920 – March 12, 1986) was a shortstop in Major League Baseball. He played for the Chicago White Sox in 1949.

References

External links

1920 births
1986 deaths
Major League Baseball shortstops
Chicago White Sox players
Baseball players from Pennsylvania